Willden is a surname. Notable people with the name include:

Charles William Willden and his son Ellott, constructors of Willden Fort, Cove Creek, Utah in 1860
Gordon Willden (1929–2019), a Canadian politician

See also

Elliot Willden House, Beaver, Utah, U.S.
Feargus O'Connor Willden House, Beaver, Utah, U.S.
John Willden House, Beaver, Utah, U.S.